Caradon was a non-metropolitan district in Cornwall, England, UK. It was abolished on 1 April 2009 and replaced by Cornwall Council.

Political control
The first election to the council was held in 1973, initially operating as a shadow authority before coming into its powers on 1 April 1974. Political control of the council from 1973 until the council's abolition in 2009 was held by the following parties:

Leadership
The leaders of the council from 2007 until the council's abolition were:

Council elections
1973 Caradon District Council election
1976 Caradon District Council election
1979 Caradon District Council election
1983 Caradon District Council election (New ward boundaries)
1987 Caradon District Council election
1991 Caradon District Council election
1995 Caradon District Council election
1999 Caradon District Council election
2003 Caradon District Council election (New ward boundaries)
2007 Caradon District Council election

By-election results

References

External links
Caradon Council

Council elections in Cornwall
District council elections in England